This is a list of hostile incidents at the Argentine border. This timeline does not include events from the 1982 Falklands War, nor the 1978 peak of the Beagle crisis with Chile.
It should be note that Argentina's use of force against Chile and the United Kingdom has been the exception rather than the rule, and some of the hostile acts or armed incidents appear to have been caused by zealous local commanders, and not as the result of a widespread strategy.

Most of the naval incidents involve illegal fishing boats predating squids and fish species outside exploitation seasons and allowed seizing by the Argentine law in Argentine Exclusive Economic Zone waters.

Incidents 
 9 June 1958
 The Argentine Navy destroyer ARA San Juan shelled and destroyed a Chilean lighthouse in the unpopulated Snipe islet in the Beagle Channel, during the Snipe incident.
 6 November 1965
 The Argentine Gendarmerie shot and killed Chilean Carabineros' Lieutenant Hernán Merino Correa during the Laguna del Desierto incident.
 28 September 1966
 A group of 18 Argentine nationalist militants hijacked a civilian Aerolineas Argentinas aircraft whilst flying over Puerto Santa Cruz and forced the captain at gunpoint to land in the Falkland Islands, where they took several civilians hostage. The crisis was resolved 36 hours later when the hijackers agreed to release their hostages and return to Argentina for trial.
 October 1966
 Forces of the Tactical Divers Group conducted covert landings in the Falklands from the submarine .
 29 November 1967
 24 June 1968
 The Argentine destroyer ARA Santa Cruz found the Soviet trawlers Pavlovo and Golfstrim fishing in Argentine territorial waters. Pavlovo managed to slip away, but Golfstrim was hit by two 40 mm rounds fired by the destroyer and captured. The fishing vessel was escorted to Mar del Plata, where she was released on 9 July after paying a $ 25,000 fine.
 4 February 1976
 The Argentine destroyer  fired warning shots at the British research ship .
 3–4 October 1977
 The Argentine Navy shelled and captured the Soviet trawler Prokopyevsk and the Bulgarians Ofelia and Aurelia off Puerto Madryn. Three Argentine seamen died from drowning and one Bulgarian sailor was wounded.
 19 October 1984
 According to the Chilean Ministry of Defense, the Argentine Army fired eight artillery rounds at a Chilean lighthouse at Punta Gusanos, near Puerto Williams.
28 May 1986
 The Argentine patrol vessel  shelled and sunk the Taiwanese trawler Chian-der 3. Two Taiwanese fishermen were killed; four others were injured.
 5 July 1991
 The British trawler Pict, which had been part of the British Task Force in the Falklands War as an auxiliary minesweeper, was captured by the patrol boat , from the Argentine Naval Prefecture.
 1995
According to British reports, the Argentine corvette ARA Granville harassed seven trawlers around Falklands waters and illuminated RFA Diligence with her radar.
 5 February 2000
 The Argentine corvette  shelled and captured the Taiwanese trawler Hou Chun 101 off San Jorge Gulf.
 12 June 2002
 The Argentine Naval Prefecture's patrol boat  shelled and damaged the Russian squid trawler Odoyevsk off Puerto Madryn.
 11 February 2004
 The Argentine corvette  shelled and sunk the Taiwanese trawler Jim Chin Tsai off Comodoro Rivadavia.
 15 March 2004
 The icebreaker  entered a maritime area designated as conservation zones under the jurisdiction of the Falkland Islands and issued demands for other ships to identify themselves.
 20 February 2006
 The British squid trawler John Cheek was seized by the patrol boat  from the Argentine Naval Prefecture.
 14 March 2016
 The Argentine patrol vessel  shelled and sunk the illegal Chinese fishing trawler Lu Yan Yuan Yu 010 after the ship refused to obey in a 4-hour pursuit and attempted to ram the patrol vessel, all 32 crew members were rescued.

Footnotes 

Incidents
Foreign relations of Argentina
International maritime incidents
Maritime incidents in Argentina
Political history of Argentina
Territorial disputes of Argentina